The Arbore are a Cushitic ethnic group living in southern Ethiopia, near Lake Chew Bahir. The Arbore people are pastoralists. With a total population of 6,850, the Abore population is divided into four villages, named: Gandareb, Kulaama, Murale, and Eegude.

Arbore language 
That the language of Arbore belongs within a "Macro-Somali" (now "Omo-Tana") group was first recognized by Sasse (1974). Other members of this group are Daasanach, Bayso, Rendille, Boni and the various Somali dialects. Omo-Tana itself is a major division of Lowland East Cushitic. Arbore's nearest relatives (jointly classified as Western Omo-Tana) are Daasanach and especially the probably extinct Kenyan language of the Elmolo fisherman of Lake Turkana. The sub-grouping is justified in terms of uniquely shared lexicon and certain common grammatical innovations, amongst which the generalizations of the absolute forms of the 1st person singular and 2nd person singular personal pronouns to subject function, thereby replacing the earlier Proto-Lowland East Cushitic forms, e.g. 2nd personal pronouns, e.g., 2nd person singular tai/u 'thou': ki/u 'thee', but Arbore ke 'thou' and 'thee'.

Arbore well exemplifies a number of typical Lowland East Cushitic features such as: a three-term number system (basic unit: singulative: plural) in nouns, within which "polarity" figures, i.e., gender alternations across the various number forms of a lexeme; a morphosyntax thoroughly deployed in distinguishing topic and contrastive focus; great morphophonological complexity in its verbal derivation and inflection. Of historical interest is the language's preservation of at least a dozen verbs of the archaic "Prefix Conjugation", often attributed to Proto-Afroasiatic itself.

Arbore ethnography 
The people who also call themselves the Hor (Hoor) live in four villages in the delta of the Limo River (also known as Dullay or Weyto) at the northern end of Lake Stephanie (Bau or Chew Bahr) in South Omo Zone. The name Arbore is used by the inhabitants of two of the four villages, Gandaraba and Kulama, whereas the inhabitants of Eegude and Murale refer to themselves as Marle, Arbore being the term traditionally employed by anthropologists and by the Ethiopian government.

The Arbore practice pastoralism, sorghum cultivation, seasonal fishing and hunting and engage in a wide regional network of bond friendship for the exchange of gifts. In 1996 their population numbered 3,840. Their economy of subsistence depends largely on the periodical floods of the river.

The age organization controls cattle, pasture and water. It distributes cultivable land after floods and guarantees law and order in the territory of the Arbore. Each generation class (herr) comes to power after an initiation which is held once in about 40 years in rituals known as ner and chirnan. Each generation class consists of four age classes (jim). The group containing the young people waiting to be initiated into a jim is called morqo. The same term is used for the four age classes organized and named, but waiting to form a generation class by undergoing initiation at the close of the 40 years.

The Garle and Olmoque clans, who are senior and junior, jointly lead the political and ritual life of the Arbore and their neighbors, and the leaders of the age organization survey the smooth running of daily life among the Arbore. The political chief is usually called kyrnat, the ritual qawot, even though it does not imply that political and religious life and functions are strictly separated. Both the Arbore and their neighbors enter the sacred cattle-gates of qawots (ritual chiefs) with gifts of heifers, bulls, honey, coffee, tobacco and herbs to receive blessings for human, animal and crop fertility, for rain and for victory against their enemies.

See also
El Molo people
Daasanach people
Western Omo–Tana languages

References

External links

Arbore tribe Ethiopia; Holidays Ethiopia

Ethnic groups in Ethiopia